Remy's Ratatouille Adventure also known as Ratatouille: L'Aventure Totalement Toquée de Rémy is a motion-based trackless 3D dark ride, based on the 2007 Disney-Pixar animated film Ratatouille, located at Disneyland Paris's Walt Disney Studios Park in France and at Walt Disney World's France Pavilion at Epcot.

Disneyland Paris officially announced the attraction in March 2013.

In both versions, the ride's dialogue alternates between English and French.

History
The attraction was revealed as part of internet rumours of an expansion of Walt Disney Studios Park's Toon Studio area. Other rumours about the expansion included a reincarnation of the popular Toy Story Midway Mania attraction to be put in the operating Toy Story Playland. The ride is one of the biggest additions to Disneyland Paris; its show building is similar in height to that of the expansive Pirates of the Caribbean attraction at the neighbouring Disneyland Park, and cost an estimated  to complete. Following the initial rumours, articles on the Internet surfaced concept paintings, ride blueprints, and images of the first phases of construction, confirming that there would be such an attraction.

Construction of the attraction officially began in 2012. It was formally announced in March 2013 at the Euro Disney S.C.A. annual shareholders meeting, with construction completed in June 2014. On 21 June 2014, the attraction was officially inaugurated by then-president and CEO of The Walt Disney Company, Robert Iger. The attraction fully opened to the public on 10 July 2014.

On July 15, 2017, Disney Parks announced during its D23 Expo presentation that a duplicate of the ride would come to Epcot's France Pavilion at Walt Disney World in Orlando, Florida in 2020. Construction began in November of the same year with land clearing. After construction delays and the impact of the COVID-19 pandemic, the attraction opened on October 1, 2021, on the 50th anniversary of the Walt Disney World Resort and the 39th anniversary of Epcot, along with a new restaurant, La Crêperie de Paris, located nearby the attraction.

On August 27, 2021, following Disneyland Paris' reopening, Walt Disney Studios Park announced that the attraction was set to become part of Worlds of Pixar.

Ride experience
The attraction's exterior is that of Gusteau's restaurant, and the surrounding buildings of a Parisian plaza, with the queue set in an artist's loft leading to the rooftops of Paris, where guests are "shrunk" to the size of a rat.

After guests board their "ratmobiles" on the roof of Gusteau's restaurant, Remy and the spirit of Chef Auguste Gusteau are deciding which meal to prepare for them. After deciding on their famous ratatouille dish, Remy and the guests fall through a swinging roof glass-pane, landing on the restaurant kitchen floor. This starts a chase sequence with Remy leading the guests and other rats away from the cooks, passing through the walk-in freezer and under a hot oven.

Guests eventually end up in the dining area, attracting attention from customers and causing a riot. Chef Skinner tries to get rid of the rats and the guests, while Alfredo Linguini tries to help them escape into a nearby vent. The escape through the vent in the walls is almost wrecked by Skinner, who angrily attempts to grab the guests through the venting grids. In the end, they make it safely to Remy's kitchen, where the cooking of the ratatouille is ongoing.

The guests are bid farewell by Remy and the spirit of Gusteau, while the rat colony is feasting on Remy's cooking. In Paris, the attraction exits at the restaurant Bistro Chez Rémy, unlike at Epcot.

Patton Oswalt, Peter Sohn, Lou Romano, and Brad Garrett reprise their voice roles from the original film as Remy, Emile, Linguini and Gusteau, respectively.

Technology
The attraction uses LPS trackless ride technology, similar to Mickey & Minnie's Runaway Railway and Mystic Manor. The ride uses rat-shaped vehicles to automatically slide across the ground with no track. It also contains 3D dome segments of the ride that the vehicles ride into. Different scent effects are employed in each room of the ride, similar to Soarin'.

Gallery

References

External links
 Walt Disney Studios Park - Ratatouille: The Adventure site
 Epcot - Remy’s Ratatouille Adventure site

Walt Disney Studios Park
Epcot
Amusement rides introduced in 2014
Amusement rides introduced in 2021
Ratatouille (film)
Toon Studio (Walt Disney Studios Park)
World Showcase
Pixar in amusement parks
Audio-Animatronic attractions
Dark rides
2014 establishments in France
2021 establishments in Florida